Nicholas Carl Dini (born July 27, 1993) is an American professional baseball catcher in the Tampa Bay Rays organization. He has played in Major League Baseball (MLB) for the Kansas City Royals.

Early life and amateur career
Dini was born on Staten Island, NY, he later moved to Monroe, New Jersey and attended Monroe Township High School. At Monroe, Dini became the school's all-time leader in hits (160), runs (128), doubles (41), triples (10), home runs (23) and RBI (117). He played college baseball at Wagner College. As a senior, Dini was named the Northeast Conference Player of the Year and third team All-America by Louisville Slugger after batting .392 with 44 RBI and 26 extra-base hits. Dini also set school records for hits (245), at-bats (793), and games played (215).

Professional career

Dini was selected by the Kansas City Royals in the 14th round of the 2015 MLB draft. After signing, Dini was assigned to the rookie-league Idaho Falls Chukars and hit .316 with four home runs and 29 RBIs in his first season of professional baseball. In 2016, Dini appeared in only 20 games with four different minor league teams due to injuries, batting .319 with nine RBIs. Dini began the 2017 season with the Class A Lexington Legends and was promoted to the Double-A Northwest Arkansas Naturals hitting a combined .302 batting average with four home runs and 36 RBIs. He was selected by the Royals to play in the Arizona Fall League for the Surprise Saguaros following the end of the season. He started 2018 with Northwest Arkansas and was named a reserve to the Texas League All-Star Game, batting .239 in 80 games before being promoted to the AAA Omaha Storm Chasers for the rest of the season. He hit .333 with three home runs and six RBIs in 14 games with Omaha. Dini was non-roster invitee to Royals spring training in 2019, but did not make the team out of camp and was assigned to AAA.

Kansas City Royals
Dini was called up to the Major Leagues on August 7, 2019, after catcher Cam Gallagher sustained an injury. He made his big league debut that same night as a pinch hitter for Meibrys Viloria and remained in the game as catcher. The next day, August 8, 2019, he made his first big league start at catcher against the Detroit Tigers and collecting his first career hit, a single off Matt Hall, while going 1–3 with a walk and a run scored. On August 19, 2019, Dini hit his first major league home run off of Gabriel Ynoa at Camden Yards in a 5–4 win over the Orioles. Dini finished his rookie season with a .196 batting average, two home runs, six RBIs and 11 runs scored in 20 games played. He also threw out four of ten attempted base stealers for a 40% caught-stealing average. Dini was designated for assignment on November 20, 2019.

New York Mets
On November 29, 2021, Dini signed a minor league deal with the New York Mets. He elected free agency on November 10, 2022.

Tampa Bay Rays
On December 15, 2022, Dini signed a minor league deal with the Tampa Bay Rays.

References

External links

Wagner Seahawks bio

1993 births
Living people
Baseball players from New Jersey
Idaho Falls Chukars players
Kansas City Royals players
Lexington Legends players
Major League Baseball catchers
Northwest Arkansas Naturals players
Omaha Storm Chasers players
People from Monroe Township, Middlesex County, New Jersey
Sportspeople from Middlesex County, New Jersey
Surprise Saguaros players
Wagner Seahawks baseball players
Wilmington Blue Rocks players
Arizona League Royals players
Syracuse Mets players